Damyan Damyanov (Bulgarian: Дамян Дамянов; born 29 June 2000) is a Bulgarian professional footballer who plays as a goalkeeper for Dunav Ruse.

Career

Ludogorets Razgrad
Damyanov made his professional debut for the first team on 20 May 2018 in a league match against Botev Plovdiv.

Career statistics

Club

References

External links
 

2000 births
Living people
Bulgarian footballers
Bulgaria under-21 international footballers
Bulgaria youth international footballers
PFC Ludogorets Razgrad players
PFC Ludogorets Razgrad II players
FC Lokomotiv 1929 Sofia players
First Professional Football League (Bulgaria) players
Second Professional Football League (Bulgaria) players
Association football goalkeepers